United First Parish Church is a Unitarian Universalist congregation in Quincy, Massachusetts, established as the parish church of Quincy in 1639. The current building was constructed in 1828 by noted Boston stonecutter Abner Joy to designs by Alexander Parris. The building was designated a National Historic Landmark on December 30, 1970, for its association with the Adams family, who funded its construction and whose most significant members are interred here.

It is called the Church of the Presidents because two American Presidents, John Adams and John Quincy Adams, attended the church along with their wives, Abigail Adams and Louisa Catherine Adams. All four are interred beneath the church in a family crypt.  The pew in which they sat is marked with a plaque and ribbon on the side.

History
The congregation first gathered in 1636 as a branch of the church in Boston, becoming an independent church in 1639, known simply as "Ye Church of Braintry," because the whole area was then known as Braintree. It was a Puritan congregationalist church when first established, but since the mid-18th century has been Unitarian, in spirit if not in name.

The 1828 church is constructed of locally quarried granite, and is one of the finest Greek Revival church buildings in New England. It has a Greek temple front, supported by four monolithic granite columns which may have been the largest set in the United States at the time. Above the main facade rises a two-stage tower. Its lower section is oblong and unadorned, while the second stage is stepped back and square. It has clock faces on each side, and is topped by an open cupola with eight columns and a dome.

President John Adams financed the church's construction through a land donation, and the bulk of the granite comes from the Adams family quarry. However, the pillars are from another local quarry, as the Adams quarry was not deep enough for a full-height pillar. Its original bell was cast by Paul Revere, but was melted down and recast as it was not loud enough to serve as a fire alarm. The unusual domed ceiling represents a passion flower surrounded by lotuses. The fine mahogany altar is original.

Adams' gravesite
Both John Adams and his son John Quincy Adams, together with their first ladies, Abigail Adams and Louisa Catherine Adams, are buried in a family vault in the church's basement. Only one other church in the United States contains a presidential tomb: the Washington National Cathedral in Washington, D.C., where the remains of President Woodrow Wilson and First Lady Edith Wilson are interred.

See also
 Church of the Presidents, Long Branch, New Jersey
 Adams National Historical Park
 List of National Historic Landmarks in Massachusetts
 National Register of Historic Places listings in Quincy, Massachusetts

References

External links
 United First Parish Church website
 United First Parish Church (Unitarian) Of Quincy's National Historic Landmark summary description
 Historical records for the United First Parish Church are in the Andover-Harvard Theological Library at Harvard Divinity School in Cambridge, Massachusetts.

National Historic Landmarks in Massachusetts
Churches in Quincy, Massachusetts
Churches completed in 1827
19th-century Unitarian Universalist church buildings
Unitarian Universalist churches in Massachusetts
Religious organizations established in the 1630s
Churches on the National Register of Historic Places in Massachusetts
Stone churches in Massachusetts
National Register of Historic Places in Quincy, Massachusetts
Presidential churches in the United States
Adams National Historical Park
1639 establishments in the Thirteen Colonies
Tombs of presidents of the United States